Meyrickella ruptellus is a species of moth in the family Erebidae. It was described by Walker in 1863. It is found in Australia.

References 

Erebidae